Renata Fonte (3 March 1951 – 31 March 1984) was an Italian politician, who served as assessor of culture, in the city council of Nardò (Lecce).

Murder
On 31 March 1984 she was killed while returning home by two killers. The actual perpetrators of the murder were quickly arrested, along with the person who had ordered it, Antonio Spagnolo the candidate next in line for a seat at the municipal elections. Although the motive remains uncertain, it is believed that the killing came in response to her political fight to prevent the subdivision and urban speculation in Porto Selvaggio bay.

References

1951 births
1984 deaths
People from Nardò
Assassinated Italian politicians